The 2013–14 season will be Ferencvárosi TC's 111th competitive season, 5th consecutive season in the OTP Bank Liga and 114th year in existence as a football club.

First team squad

Transfers

Summer

In:

Out:

Winter

In:

Out:

List of Hungarian football transfers summer 2013
List of Hungarian football transfers winter 2013–14

Statistics

Appearances and goals
Last updated on 1 June 2014.

|-
|colspan="14"|Youth players:

|-
|colspan="14"|Players no longer at the club:

|}

Top scorers
Includes all competitive matches. The list is sorted by shirt number when total goals are equal.

Last updated on 1 June 2014

Disciplinary record
Includes all competitive matches. Players with 1 card or more included only.

Last updated on 1 June 2014

Overall
{|class="wikitable"
|-
|Games played || 45 (30 OTP Bank Liga, 3 Hungarian Cup and 12 Hungarian League Cup)
|-
|Games won || 26 (17 OTP Bank Liga, 1 Hungarian Cup and 8 Hungarian League Cup)
|-
|Games drawn || 9 (6 OTP Bank Liga, 1 Hungarian Cup and 2 Hungarian League Cup)
|-
|Games lost || 10 (7 OTP Bank Liga, 1 Hungarian Cup and 2 Hungarian League Cup)
|-
|Goals scored || 81
|-
|Goals conceded || 45
|-
|Goal difference || +36
|-
|Yellow cards || 111
|-
|Red cards || 10
|-
|rowspan="1"|Worst discipline ||  Muhamed Bešić (13 , 2 )
|-
|rowspan="1"|Best result || 10–0 (A) v Szekszárd – Magyar Kupa – 29-10-2013
|-
|rowspan="3"|Worst result || 1–4 (A) v Debrecen – OTP Bank Liga – 25-08-2013
|-
| 1–4 (A) v Győr – Ligakupa – 16-10-2013
|-
| 0–3 (H) v Szombathely – OTP Bank Liga – 10-11-2013
|-
|rowspan="1"|Most appearances ||  Gábor Gyömbér (40 appearances)
|-
|rowspan="1"|Top scorer ||  Dániel Böde (17 goals)
|-
|Points || 87/135 (64.44%)
|-

Nemzeti Bajnokság I

Matches

Classification

Results summary

Results by round

Hungarian Cup

League Cup

Group stage

Classification

Knockout phase

Pre-season

References

External links
 Eufo
 Official Website
 UEFA
 fixtures and results

2013-14
Hungarian football clubs 2013–14 season